Vanessa Legault-Cordisco (born May 11, 1992) is a former Canadian professional soccer player.

Legault-Cordisco began her college career at the University of Evansville, before transferring to Marquette University. She was named to the 2012-13 BIG EAST All-Academic Team.

After appearances for the Canada U20 team, Legault-Cordisco received her first call-up to the senior Canadian National Team in 2010 at the age of 18. She was named to the Canadian Team for the 2011 Pan American Games where they won the gold medal.

References

1992 births
Living people
Canadian women's soccer players
Pan American Games medalists in football
Pan American Games gold medalists for Canada
Marquette Golden Eagles women's soccer players
Women's association football defenders
Footballers at the 2011 Pan American Games
Soccer people from Quebec
Sportspeople from Laval, Quebec
Evansville Purple Aces women's soccer players
Medalists at the 2011 Pan American Games